Szilárd Kiss (born 9 December 1975) is a Hungarian athlete. He competed in the men's shot put at the 2000 Summer Olympics.

References

1975 births
Living people
Athletes (track and field) at the 2000 Summer Olympics
Hungarian male shot putters
Olympic athletes of Hungary
Place of birth missing (living people)
20th-century Hungarian people